Anselmo José Braamcamp de Almeida Castelo Branco (23 October 1817 – 13 November 1885) was a Portuguese politician of the Constitutional Monarchy era. He was the leader of the Historic Party (later, the Progressive Party), Minister of the Kingdom and, between 1879 and 1880, Head of Government (President of the Council of Ministers).

References

1817 births
1885 deaths
Naval ministers of Portugal
People from Lisbon
Progressive Party (Portugal) politicians
Prime Ministers of Portugal
Finance ministers of Portugal
19th-century Portuguese people
University of Coimbra alumni

Portuguese people of Italian descent